Jackyl is the debut album by American rock band Jackyl. It was released on August 11, 1992, on Geffen.

Background
The record's clean issuance omits "She Loves My Cock." Likewise, on the cover art of edited versions, the "Parental Advisory" logo in the background is altered to say "Meaty bones beware of Jackyl."

Music videos were made for the tracks "The Lumberjack" (featuring the band performing at a wooded shack, complete with the chainsaw solo), "I Stand Alone" (featuring the band performing in front of a K-Mart as a protest for the store refusing to sell their album), "Down On Me", "Dirty Little Mind", "When Will It Rain" and "Back Off Brother".

Track listing
All songs written by Jesse Dupree except as noted.
"I Stand Alone" - 3:58
"Dirty Little Mind" - 3:30
"Down on Me" - 4:03
"When Will It Rain" - 4:34
"Redneck Punk" (Jeff Worley/Ronnie Honeycutt) - 3:37
"The Lumberjack"  - 3:32
"Reach for Me" (Jesse Dupree/John Hayes) - 3:34
"Back off Brother" - 3:25
"Brain Drain" (Jeff Worley/Jimmy Stiff) - 4:58
"Just Like a Devil" - 3:34
"She Loves My Cock" - 3:51

Singles

Personnel
Jesse James Dupree – vocals & chainsaw
Jimmy Stiff – guitars
Jeff Worley – guitars
Thomas Bettini – bass
Chris Worley – drums

References

1992 debut albums
Jackyl albums
Albums produced by Brendan O'Brien (record producer)
Geffen Records albums